HMAS Farncomb (SSG 74) is the second of six s operated by the Royal Australian Navy (RAN). Named for Rear Admiral Harold Farncomb, the submarine was laid down in 1993 and launched in December 1995—the first submarine to be completely constructed in Australia. A combination of factors led to Farncomb being the only vessel of her class in operational condition in mid-2009.

Characteristics

The Collins class is an enlarged version of the  submarine designed by Kockums. The hull is constructed from high-tensile micro-alloy steel, and are covered in a skin of anechoic tiles to minimise detection by sonar.

The submarine is armed with six  torpedo tubes, and carry a standard payload of 22 torpedoes: originally a mix of Gould Mark 48 Mod 4 torpedoes and UGM-84C Sub-Harpoon, with the Mark 48s later upgraded to the Mod 7 Common Broadband Advanced Sonar System (CBASS) version.

Each submarine is equipped with three Garden Island-Hedemora HV V18b/15Ub (VB210) 18-cylinder diesel engines, which are each connected to a 1,400 kW, 440-volt DC Jeumont-Schneider generator. The electricity generated is stored in batteries, then supplied to a single Jeumont-Schneider DC motor, which provides 7,200 shaft horsepower to a single, seven-bladed,  diameter skewback propeller. The Collins class has a speed of  when surfaced and at snorkel depth, and can reach  underwater. Each boat has an endurance of 70 days.

Construction and trials
Farncomb was laid down by Australian Submarine Corporation (ASC) on 3 March 1991. She was named for Rear Admiral Harold Farncomb; the first Australian-trained officer promoted to Captain, and commanding officer of the flagship  from 1941 to 1944. Work on the boat was delayed by the need to complete sister boat and class lead  to a launchable condition by her set launch date of 28 August 1993. To free up resources at ASC for Collins, Farncombs bow section was sent to Newcastle for completion.

Farncomb was launched on 15 December 1995: as she was the first submarine to be completely constructed in Australia (two sections of Collins had been assembled in Sweden), the submarine wore a large Made In Australia logo on the fin. The submarine commenced sea trials in September 1996. Lessons learned from the trials of lead boat Collins benefitted Farncomb, with training materials improved and the trials crew instructed to familiarise themselves with the submarine while she was being completed (the crew of Collins had the option to, but most personnel did not). The trial program was impacted on by problems with Collins.

Farncomb was provisionally accepted into service by the RAN at the end of 1997. She was formally commissioned into the RAN on 31 January 1998.

Operational history
In May 1997, two groups of six female sailors were posted to Collins and Farncomb as a test on the feasibility of mixed-sex crews aboard submarines. Following the trial's success, eleven female sailors and one female officer commenced training for the submarine service in 1998.

In 1998, while returning from Timor, all three of Farncombs diesel generators broke down. The submarine limped to Darwin, where she waited several weeks for replacement parts to be organised and transported.

On 19 March 2007, during a five-month intelligence-gathering mission in Asian waters, fishing lines became entangled in Fancombs propeller. The submarine surfaced in international waters during the calm night, and five sailors were out on the casing attempting to free the propeller when the weather suddenly worsened and the sailors were washed overboard. A rescue party, involving three volunteer swimmers was successful in retrieving the five sailors during a ninety-minute effort, and the submarine continued on without detection. The incident remained classified until August 2009, when the RAN nominated the three rescue swimmers for bravery decorations, the first submariners to be nominated since a 1981 incident aboard .

In 2008 and 2009, personnel shortages reduced the number of submarines able to be deployed to three, with the maintenance schedule and battery malfunctions on several boats combining to reduce this to one, Farncomb in mid-2009.

On the morning of 13 March 2009, Farncomb was one of seventeen warships involved in a ceremonial fleet entry and fleet review in Sydney Harbour, the largest collection of RAN ships since the Australian Bicentenary in 1988. The submarine did not participate in the fleet entry, but was anchored in the harbour for the review.

In January 2010, Farncomb was forced to return to port for urgent repairs after a generator failure.

In August 2011, Farncomb suddenly lost propulsion while using the schnorkel at periscope depth off Rottnest Island. The restart did not function, and the boat began falling backwards. A full emergency ballast blow brought the submarine to the surface, and the engine was restarted.

Farncomb was deployed to Hawaii to participate in the 2012 Rim of the Pacific (RIMPAC) multinational exercise. On 22 July, the submarine fired a Mark 48 torpedo at the former ammunition ship , breaking the ship in two and sinking her. A few days later, a hose in the submarine's weight compensation system split while the boat was recharging her batteries, causing flooding. Farncomb surfaced from periscope depth without major incident and sailed to Pearl Harbor for repairs.

In October 2013, Farncomb was the only submarine to participate in the International Fleet Review 2013 in Sydney. During November 2013, Farncomb participated in the Black Carillion 2013 submarine escape training exercise. She returned to the Fleet in August 2016.

Farncomb returned to base at Fleet Base West, Rockingham, in August 2019 after a five month deployment during which she participated in the international exercises Bersama Shield, Pacific Vanguard and Talisman Sabre.

In October 2022 Farncomb visited Yokosuka in Japan to participate in an international fleet review organised to mark the 70th anniversary of the Japanese Maritime Self Defense Force.

References

Bibliography

Books

Journal and news articles

External links

Collins-class submarines
Ships built in South Australia
1995 ships
Submarines of Australia
Military Units in Western Australia